Domantas Antanavičius (born 18 November 1998) is a Lithuanian footballer who plays as a midfielder for Atyrau.

Club career
Antanavičius made his professional debut for Celje in the Slovenian PrvaLiga on 22 February 2020, coming on as a substitute in the 90th minute for Žan Benedičič in the home match against Aluminij, which finished as a 2–0 win.

References

External links
 
 
 Domantas Antanavičius at LFF.lt 

1998 births
Living people
Sportspeople from Marijampolė
Lithuanian footballers
Lithuania youth international footballers
Lithuania under-21 international footballers
Lithuanian expatriate footballers
Lithuanian expatriate sportspeople in Estonia
Expatriate footballers in Estonia
Lithuanian expatriate sportspeople in Slovenia
Expatriate footballers in Slovenia
Lithuanian expatriate sportspeople in Kazakhstan
Expatriate footballers in Kazakhstan
Association football midfielders
FK Sūduva Marijampolė players
FC Stumbras players
Maardu Linnameeskond players
NK Celje players
NK Triglav Kranj players
FK Panevėžys players
FC Atyrau players
A Lyga players
Meistriliiga players
Slovenian PrvaLiga players
Slovenian Second League players
Kazakhstan Premier League players